With Vilest of Worms to Dwell is the second studio album by Austrian symphonic death metal band Hollenthon, released by Napalm Records in 2001.

Track listing
Music by Martin Schirenc, lyrics by Elena Schirenc.

"Y Draig Goch" – 3:55
"Woe to the Defeated" – 5:51
"Lords of Bedlam" – 5:35
"To Kingdom Come" – 5:33
"The Calm Before the Storm" – 5:03
"Fire upon the Blade" – 5:18
"Conquest Demise" – 6:32
"Conspirator" – 7:23

 "Lords of Bedlam" incorporates elements of Sergei Prokofiev's Romeo and Juliet (Dance of the Knights) and "To Kingdom Come" includes portions from Carl Orff's rendition of the Carmina Burana.

Personnel

Hollenthon
 Martin Schirenc - vocals, guitar, bass, keyboards
 Mike Gröger - drums, percussion
 Elena Schirenc - vocals

Additional musicians
 Rob Barrett (Cannibal Corpse) - guitar solo on "Woe to the Defeated"

Production
Recorded and mixed by Martin Schirenc at Vato Loco Studio/Vienna, March 2001.
Mastered by Akeem Koehler at Indiscreet Audio/Winterbach
Cover concept and layout by Martin Schirenc.
Band photos by Klaus Pichler.

References

Hollenthon albums
2001 albums
Napalm Records albums